Malnes Church is a parish church of the Church of Norway in Bø Municipality in Nordland county, Norway. It is located in the village of Eide. It is one of the churches for the Bø og Malnes parish which is part of the Vesterålen prosti (deanery) in the Diocese of Sør-Hålogaland. The white, wooden church was built in a long church style in 1895 using plans drawn up by the architect Ole Scheistrøen. The church seats about 320 people.

History
The earliest existing historical records of the church date back to the year 1589, but the church was likely founded in the early 1500s. The first church at Malnes, near the village of Hovden. Around the year 1700, a new church building was constructed. It was likely a rectangular log building without a tower.

In 1814, this church served as an election church. Together with more than 300 other parish churches across Norway, it was a polling station for elections to the 1814 Norwegian Constituent Assembly which wrote the Constitution of Norway. This was Norway's first national elections. Each church parish was a constituency that elected people called "electors" who later met together in each county to elect the representatives for the assembly that was to meet in Eidsvoll later that year.

By the early-1820s, the church had fallen into disrepair and was demolished in 1822. The old cemetery at Malnes was in use until 1900. The church needed to be expanded by the end of the century, so in 1894 it was torn down and replaced with a new building. The new church was built at Eide and it was consecrated on 7 April 1895 by Bishop Peter W. K. Bøckman, Sr.

See also
List of churches in Sør-Hålogaland

References

Bø, Nordland
Churches in Nordland
Wooden churches in Norway
19th-century Church of Norway church buildings
Churches completed in 1895
16th-century establishments in Norway
Norwegian election church
Long churches in Norway